Taylah Robertson (born 23 April 1998) is an Australian professional boxer. As an amateur she won a bronze medal at the 2018 Commonwealth Games.

Early life 
Taylah Robertson was born in Townsville, Australia, in 1998. Shortly after she moved to Brisbane where she attended early primary school. She then moved to Bribie Island to finish her schooling through to year 12 at St Columban's College, Caboolture. She finished her high school graduation certificate and completed her cert 3 and 4 in fitness.

Amateur career 
Robertson started boxing at the age of 12 and won her first Australian title as a junior at 15 in Perth, Western Australia. She went on to win more Australian national titles and eventually joined the National Team of Australia, competing internationally over four years, winning a bronze medal at the 2018 Commonwealth Games and participating in the 2019 World Championships.

Professional career 
In late 2019 Robertson signed a professional contract with MTK Global. In early February she had her first professional fight in the Sleeman Centre, Brisbane at bantamweight, winning in under 56 seconds by technical knockout (TKO).

Before the COVID-19 pandemic, she went to the US to train in West Hollywood, California, at Justin Fortune's gym. Her trip was cut short by the COVID-19 lockdown and she returned to Australia.

Professional boxing record

Appearances and honours 
 5 × Australian champion
 Commonwealth games bronze medallist
 World championship representative (Russia)
 Kalpori cup 2018 bronze medal (Indonesia)
 Boxer Cup 2018/2019 Silver and Gold medalist (Spain)
 Ahmet Cup Silver medallist (Turkey)
 5 × state champion
 2 × Golden Glove champion

References

External links

Australian women boxers
Boxers at the 2018 Commonwealth Games
Commonwealth Games bronze medallists for Australia
Commonwealth Games medallists in boxing
Featherweight boxers
Sportspeople from Townsville
1998 births
Living people
Medallists at the 2018 Commonwealth Games